Gilla na Naemh Crom Ó Seachnasaigh (died 1224) was an Irish Chief of the Name.

Ó Seachnasaigh was lord of Cenél Áeda na hEchtge, but is only recorded in the Irish annals towards the end of his era.

 1222: Gilla Mo Choinni Ó Cahill, Lord of Kinelea East and West, was slain by Shaughnessy, the son of Gilla na Naemh Crom Ó Seachnasaigh, after having been betrayed by his own people.
 1223: Seachnasaigh Ó Seachnasaigh, the son of Gilla na Naemh Ó Seachnasaigh, was slain by the Clann-Cuilen, a deed by which the Bachal mor of St. Colman, of Kilmacduagh was profaned.
 1224. Gilla na Naemh Crom Ó Seachnasaigh, Lord of the Western half of Kinelea of Echtge, died.

Only three more Ó Seachnasaigh's would be named in the annals before the 16th century (1240, 1403, 1408), none of them chiefs. Thus the succession of the lordship is unclear till c. 1533.

References

 http://www.ucc.ie/celt/published/T100005C/
 John O'Donovan. The Genealogies, Tribes, and Customs of Hy-Fiachrach. Dublin: Irish Archaeological Society. 1844. Pedigree of O'Shaughnessy: pp. 372–91.
 Galway: History and Society, 1996

Medieval Gaels from Ireland
Irish lords
People from County Galway
Gilla
13th-century Irish people